Tryptophan hydroxylase 2 (TPH2) is an isozyme of tryptophan hydroxylase found in vertebrates. In humans, TPH2 is primarily expressed in the serotonergic neurons of the brain, with the highest expression in the raphe nucleus of the midbrain. Until the discovery of TPH2 in 2003, serotonin levels in the central nervous system were believed to be regulated by serotonin synthesis in peripheral tissues, in which tryptophan hydroxylase is the dominant form.

Function 

Tryptophan hydroxylase (TPH; EC 1.14.16.4) is the rate-limiting enzyme in the synthesis of serotonin (5-hydroxytryptamine, or 5HT). 5HT is causally involved in numerous central nervous activities, and it has several functions in peripheral tissues, including the maintenance of vascular tone and gut motility.[supplied by OMIM]

Disabling this enzyme with drugs (especially p-chlorophenylalanine aka PCPA and Fenclonine) has allowed researchers to investigate the effects of very low serotonin levels on humans and others animals, and by extension, gain insights into the functions of serotonin systems more broadly (such as hypersexuality in rodents as well as increased aggression and hypersexuality cats following PCPA administration). In rat brain, administration of a single PCPA injection resulted in the lowest level of serotonin production occurring on day 2 and returning to control values on day 7. Drugs such as MDMA and methamphetamine have been shown to lower levels of this enzyme which may result in periods of low serotonin levels following drug use. In a study investigating the effects of Fenclonine on humans, the greatly lowered serotonin levels were associated with "fatigue, dizziness, nausea, uneasiness [anxiety], fullness in the head [a feeling of pressure in the head] paresthesias [a pricking, pins-and-needles, burning, and/or aching sensation--typically the limbs], headache, and constipation".

See also 
 Tryptophan hydroxylase
 TPH1

References

Further reading 

 
 
 
 
 
 
 
 
 
 
 
 
 
 
 
 
 
 

Biology of bipolar disorder